The 1990–91 Southern Football League season was the 88th in the history of the league, an English football competition.

Farnborough Town won the Premier Division and earned promotion to the Football Conference, having been relegated from the Conference the year before. Weymouth, who finished bottom of the Premier Division, were relegated to the Southern Division, whilst Rushden Town, despite finishing fourteenth, were relegated to the Midland Division as their ground did not meet the Premier Division criteria. The champions of the Midland and Southern divisions both failed to win promotion, meaning that only the second-placed clubs, Corby Town and Trowbridge Town were promoted.

Premier Division
The Premier Division consisted of 22 clubs, including 17 clubs from the previous season and five new clubs:
Two clubs promoted from the Midland Division:
Halesowen Town
Rushden Town

Two clubs promoted from the Southern Division:
Bashley
Poole Town

Plus:
Farnborough Town, relegated from the Football Conference

League table

Midland Division
The Midland Division consisted of 22 clubs, including 18 clubs from the previous season and four new clubs:
Two clubs relegated from the Premier Division:
Alvechurch
Corby Town

Plus:
Hinckley Town, promoted from the West Midlands (Regional) League
Newport, promoted from the Hellenic League

League table

Southern Division
The Southern Division consisted of 22 clubs, including 17 clubs from the previous season and five new clubs:
Two clubs relegated from the Premier Division:
Ashford Town (Kent)
Gosport Borough

Plus:
Folkestone Town, elected to replace the defunct Folkestone
Newport (Isle of Wight), promoted from the Wessex League
Sudbury Town, promoted from the Eastern Counties League

League table

See also
Southern Football League
1990–91 Isthmian League
1990–91 Northern Premier League

References

Southern Football League seasons
6